Per Jørgensen (born 9 September 1952) is a Norwegian multi-instrumentalist with trumpet as his main instrument, also known for his vocal contributions, in collaboration with Dag Arnesen, Knut Kristiansen, Alex Riel, Jon Christensen, Jon Balke, Audun Kleive, Jan Gunnar Hoff, Marilyn Mazur, Nils Petter Molvær, Bugge Wesseltoft, and Terje Isungset.

Career
Jørgensen was a major voice in Bergen Jazz Community in the 1970s, with marked musical performances with bands such as Danmarksplass Rock og Jazz (trumpet and voice) with the young saxophoneplayer Olav Dale from Voss and the profound Bergen guitarist Ole Thomsen, now central member of the Bergen Big Band. He was also a central member of the Bergen Blues Band (guitar and voice) and Knut Kristiansen Kvintett, and later on 'Tamma', JøKleBa, Magnetic North Orchestra and in various duo projects with Jon Balke, Terje Isungset and others.

In 1991, Jørgensen was awarded "Vossajazzprisen" for his contribution to jazz in Hordaland, and was the same year he was elected "FNJ" (The Norwegian Jazz Musicians Federation) "Jazz Musician of the Year". From 1992, he held a Trio ("J.I.G.") in Bergen together with Terje Isungset and Ole Amund Gjersvik, in 1993 he also had a trio collaboration with Eldbjørg Raknes and Christian Wallumrød, and toured with Jon Balke & Magnetic North Orchestra (recording in 1993 released 1995, another release 2002 and one in 2004). In 1995, he was a soloist with the "Veslefrekk" at Vossajazz.

Jørgensen has extensive collaboration with many international performers including guitarist Tobias Sjögren with Unspoken Songs and The Thule Spirit (2006), and percursjonist Marilyn Mazur with firstly Circular Chant (1995) with among others Nils Petter Molvær and Bugge Wesseltoft.

Honors
1991: Vossajazzprisen, awarded for his contribution to jazz in Hordaland
1991: "Jazz Musician of the Year", awarded by "FNJ" (The Norwegian Jazz Musicians Federation)
1995: Buddyprisen
2001: Radka Toneff Memorial Award

Discography
Album participations:
With JøKleBa
1991: On And On – (Odin Records) – trumpet, flute, vocal
1993: Jøkleba! – (Norsk Plateproduksjon AS) – trumpet, vocal
1996: Live! – (Curling Legs) – trumpet, vocal
2011: Nu Jøk? – (EmArcy, Universal Music Norway) – trumpet, vocal
2014: Outland (ECM Records)

With Jon Balke and Magnetic North Orchestra
1992: Further – (ECM) – trumpet, vocals
1995: Solarized – (Emarcy) – trumpet, vocals
2002: Kyanos – (ECM) – trumpet, vocals
2004: Diverted travels – (ECM) – trumpet, vocals
2012: Magnetic Works 1993–2001 (ECM), compilation

Duo with Tobias Sjøgren
1996: Unspoken Words – trumpet, vocals
2006: The Thule Spirit – (ToBeJazz Music) – trumpet, vocals

With other projects
1991: Secret Mission – Strange Afternoon – trumpet, citar
1992: Jon Balke and Oslo 13 – Nonsentration – trumpet
1994: Kari Bremnes – Gåte Ved Gåte – trumpet
1995: Marilyn Mazur and Pulse Unit – Circular Chant (Storyville) – trumpet, vocals
1995: Knut Kristiansen Monk Moods (Odin Records)
1995: Jan Gunnar Hoff – Moving1996: Hans Børlie lytrics – Prøv å sette vinger på en stein1997: Terje Isungset – Reise1997: Michael Mantler - The School of Understanding (ECM Records)  - vocals
1998: Berit Opheim, Bjørn Kjellemyr, Einar Mjølsnes, Per Jørgensen and Sigbjørn Apeland – Fryd  (Vossajazz Records) – trumpet
1998: Unge Frustrerte Menn – Øl og Peanøtter – trumpet
1998: Chocolate Overdose – Whatever – trumpet
2002: "Headwaiter" – Not Goin' Anywhere – vocals
2002: Cæcilie Norby – First Conversation – trumpet, vocals
2004: Svein Folkvord's commissioned work for Vossajazz 2004 – Across (Vossa Jazz Records) – vocals, trumpet
2005: Hildegunn Riise and Edvard Askeland (Lyrics by Olav H. Hauge) Under stjernone – vocals, trumpet
2006: Miki N'Doye – Tuku – vocals, trumpet
2007: Terje Isungset – Two Moons – vocals, ice-trumpet
2008: Per Jørgensen and Terje Isungset – Agbalagba Daada (NorCD) – trumpet, heriba-ton, tabla, flute, coupon, vocals, kalimba, percussion, piano
2009: Lena Skjerdal – Home2010: Per Jørgensen and Espen Berg's trio "Green Serene" Living live2010: Daniel Herskedal "City Stories»
2010: gruppa BMX med "Bergen open»
2010: Markku Ounaskari, Samuli Mikkonen and Per Jørgensen – Kuára: Psalms And Folk Songs (ECM) – trumpet
2011: Gabriel Fliflet – Åresong''

As producer
2008: Per Jørgensen and Terje Isungset – Agbalagba Daada (NorCD)

As composer/songwriter
2007: Terje Isungset – Two Moons
2008: Per Jørgensen and Terje Isungset – Agbalagba Daada (NorCD)

References

External links
 Biography – Store Norske Leksikon

1952 births
Living people
20th-century Norwegian trumpeters
21st-century Norwegian trumpeters
20th-century Norwegian male singers
20th-century Norwegian singers
21st-century Norwegian male singers
21st-century Norwegian singers
20th-century Norwegian multi-instrumentalists
21st-century Norwegian multi-instrumentalists
Musicians from Bergen
Jazz-blues guitarists
Norwegian jazz singers
Norwegian jazz trumpeters
Male trumpeters
Norwegian multi-instrumentalists
20th-century guitarists
21st-century guitarists
Male jazz musicians
Agbaland members
JøKleBa members
ECM Records artists
NorCD artists
Odin Records artists
EmArcy Records artists
Curling Legs artists